Albert Rose (21 March 1881 – 18 April 1962) was a British wrestler. He competed in the men's Greco-Roman lightweight at the 1908 Summer Olympics.

References

External links
 

1881 births
1962 deaths
British male sport wrestlers
Olympic wrestlers of Great Britain
Wrestlers at the 1908 Summer Olympics
Place of birth missing